Dale Stanley Hall (June 21, 1924 – August 23, 1996) was an American football and basketball player and coach.  He played football and basketball at the United States Military Academy, where he was a two-time All-American in basketball and was named the Sporting News Men's College Basketball Player of the Year in 1945.  Hall served as the head football coach at West Point from 1959 to 1961, compiling a record of 16–11–2.  He was also the head basketball coach at the University of New Hampshire during the 1951–52 season, tallying a mark of 11–9.

Head coaching record

Football

References

1924 births
1996 deaths
All-American college men's basketball players
American men's basketball players
Army Black Knights football coaches
Army Black Knights men's basketball players
Basketball coaches from Kansas
Basketball players from Kansas
College men's basketball head coaches in the United States
Florida Gators football coaches
Forwards (basketball)
New Hampshire Wildcats football coaches
New Hampshire Wildcats men's basketball coaches
People from Pittsburg, Kansas
People from Palm Coast, Florida
Players of American football from Kansas
Purdue Boilermakers football coaches